Farsiat-e Bozorg (also Romanized as Fārsīāt-e Bozorg) is a village in Muran Rural District, in the Soveyseh District of Karun County, Khuzestan Province, Iran. At the 2006 census, its population was 458, in 95 families.

References 

Populated places in Karun County